Linda Aksomitis, née Linda Demyen (born 7 August 1954) is a Canadian author specialising in children's and travel literature, as well as nonfiction about the history of the snowmobile. She is a former president of the Saskatchewan Writer's Guild.

After a career that spanned more than 35+ paying jobs, Aksomitis now works as a full-time writer and writing instructor. She is also a photojournalist, and schoolteacher in Canada.

Born in Regina, Saskatchewan, during her early teens, she wrote poetry under the pseudonym Sunflower Sue as occasionally published in The Western Producer magazine.

Aksomitis lives in Qu'Appelle, Saskatchewan.

Selected bibliography
 L is for Land of Living Skies: A Saskatchewan Alphabet, Sleeping Bear Press, 2010; illustrated by Lorna Bennett 
 Longhorns and Outlaws. Coteau Books, 2008. 
 Adeline's Dream. Coteau Books, 2005. 
 Backroad Mapbook: Southern Saskatchewan. Mussio Ventures, 2005. 
 Backroad mapbook: Nova Scotia. Mussio Ventures, 2005. 
 Illustrated Guide to Snowmobile Racing. Iconografix, 2006. 
 Snowmobile Adventures: The Incredible Canadian Success Story from Bombardier to the Villeneuves. Altitude, 2006. 
 Teacher's Guide for Snowmobile Challenge and Amazing Stories: Snowmobile Adventures. Altitude, 2006.

References

External links

 
 Linda Aksomitis at the Canadian Society of Children's Authors, Illustrators, and Performers (CANSCAIP.org)
 Review of Illustrated Guide to Snowmobile Racing in CM magazine
 Review of L is for Land of Living Skies in the Billings Gazette
 

Living people
1954 births
Canadian children's writers
Writers from Regina, Saskatchewan
People from Qu'Appelle, Saskatchewan